Nina Rodríguez is the  self-titled debut studio album by Colombian singer-songwriter Nina Rodríguez, released on June 12, 2013.

Track listing

References

2013 debut albums
Nina Rodríguez albums